Gunlock may refer to:

Firearms 
Gunlock, a flintlock mechanism fitted to a cannon, that fires it when a cord is pulled
Gunlock or gun lock, another name for a trigger lock, a device for securing firearms

Geography 
Gunlock, Kentucky, United States
Gunlock, Utah, United States
Gunlock State Park, Utah

Video games 
RayForce, a 1993 arcade game by Taito titled Gunlock in European arcades

Comics 
Saiyuki (manga), Saiyuki Reload Gunlock